Stan Getz Plays Music from the Soundtrack of Mickey One is a 1965 studio album by Stan Getz arranged by Eddie Sauter of their music for the soundtrack of the 1965 film Mickey One. The two men had previously collaborated on Getz's album Focus (1961).

Reception

Billboard chose the album as their 'Soundtrack Spotlight' in their November 6, 1965 issue and wrote that "Getz's alto sax  conjures up the feeling of a big city and the loneliness, excitement, despair, and frustrations of those who live in it. The tension mounts in the score as in the film".

Stephen Cook reviewed the album for Allmusic and wrote that Getz was "well-prepared for the demanding task of soloing atop expansive movie soundtrack charts...Amidst Sauter's kaleidoscopic and mercurial backdrop, Getz offers up a fine mix of fluid improvisation and solo commentary. Never overpowered by the, at times, monumental full-band outbursts, Getz is able to remain poised and even break through the walls of sound with vigorous yet cogent statements of his own".

The Penguin Guide to Jazz Recordings describes the album as “a formidable piece of work.”

Track listing
All compositions by Eddie Sauter.
 "Once Upon a Time" – 3:58
 "Mickey's Theme" – 2:22
 "On Stage (I'm a Polack Noel Coward)"/"Mickey's Flight"/"The Crushout (Total Death)" – 3:00
 "Is There Any Word From the Lord?"/"Up From Limbo"/"If You Ever Need Me"/"A Taste of Living"/"Shaley's Neighborhood Sewer & The Pickle Club Rock"/"The Agent"/"The Stripper" – 10:48
 "The Sucubba" – 3:28
 "Mickey Polka" – 0:54
 "Where I Live"/"The Apartment"/"Cleaning Up For Jenny"/"The Polish Landlady" – 2:28
 "I Put My Life In Your Hands"/"A Girl Named Jenny" – 3:40
 "YES – The Creature Machine"/"Guilty of Not Being Innocent"/"Touching In Love"/"A Five Day Life"/"The Syndicate"/"Ruby Lapp Is Dead"/"(Going To) Who Owns Me"/"The Big Fight"/"Darkness Before the Day" – 11:34
 "Morning Ecstasy (Under the Scaffold)" – 0:50
 "As Long As I Live" – 2:06
 "Is There Any Word? So This Is the Word" – 1:53

Personnel

Stan Getz - tenor saxophone, producer
Eddie Sauter - arranger, conductor, producer
Richard Davis - double bass
Wally Kane - bassoon, clarinet, bass saxophone
Charles McCracken, George Ricci, Bruce Rogers, Harvey Shapiro - cello
Harvey Estrin - clarinet, flute, alto flute, piccolo, alto saxophone
Al Block - clarinet, flute, piccolo, tenor saxophone
Ray Shiner - clarinet, cor anglais, oboe, tenor saxophone
Mel Lewis - drums
Fred Christie - engineer
Clark Terry - flugelhorn, trumpet
Bob Abernathy, Ray Alonge, Richard Berg, James Buffington, Earl Chapin - French horn
Barry Galbraith - guitar
Gloria Agostini, Laura Newell - harp
Elden C. Bailey, Herbert Herbie Harris, Phil Kraus, Walter Rosenberg, Joe Venuto - percussion
Roger Kellaway - piano
Tommy Mitchell - bass trombone
Eddie Bert, Johnny Messner, Eph Resnick, Sonny Russo - trombone
Al DeRisi, Joe Ferrante, Bobby Nichols - trumpet
Harvey E. Phillips - tuba
Julien Barber, Alfred Brown, Leon Ferngut, Dave Mankovitz, Julius Shaier, Janet Simons - viola
Herbert Baumel, Norman Carr, Bernard Eichen, Louis Gabowitz, Leo Kruczek, Charles Libove, Alan Martin, David Nadien, George Ockner, John Pintavalle, Matthew Raimondi, Ed Simons, Ben Steinberg - violin
Donald Ashworth, Charles Russo - woodwind

References

1965 soundtrack albums
Albums arranged by Eddie Sauter
Orchestral jazz albums
Stan Getz albums
MGM Records soundtracks